Monkey Bridge, published in 1997, is the debut novel of Vietnamese American attorney and writer Lan Cao.  Cao is a professor of international law at Chapman University School of Law. She fled Vietnam in 1975, at the end of the Vietnam War. In addition to Monkey Bridge, Cao also co-authored Everything You Need to Know about Asian American History with Himilce Novas.

Plot summary

Cowart, David. "Assimilation and Adolescence: Jamaica Kincaid's Lucy and Lan Cao's Monkey Bridge."  Trailing Clouds: Immigrant Fiction in Contemporary America. Ithaca: Cornell UP, 2006. 138–59.

Monkey Bridge companion website:

References

1997 American novels
Vietnamese-American history
Vietnamese PEN Club
Novels by Lan Cao
Novels set in the United States
Novels set during the Vietnam War
1997 debut novels